Oropogon salazinicus is a species of foliose lichen in the family Parmeliaceae. Found in East Asia, it was described as a new species by lichenologist Ted Esslinger in 1989. The lichen has also been recorded from Mount Kinabalu in Sabah, Malaysia. The specific epithet refers to the presence of salazinic acid, a major secondary compound in the lichen. Norstictic acid also occurs as a minor component. Molecular phylogenetic analysis shows that Oropogon salazinicus is in a clade that has a sister taxon relationship with a clade containing the species O. secalonicus, O. orientalis, and O. yunnanensis.

References

Parmeliaceae
Lichen species
Lichens described in 1989
Lichens of Asia